Parviz Farrokhi (born September 10, 1968) is an Iranian male beach volleyball player. He competed at the 2012 Asian Beach Games in Haiyang, China. He is 2011 Asian Champion with his teammate Aghmohammad Salagh.

References

1968 births
Living people
Iranian beach volleyball players
Men's beach volleyball players
Beach volleyball players at the 2010 Asian Games
Asian Games competitors for Iran